Sunset Hill is a mountain in the Central New York Region of New York. It is located in the towns of Richfield and Warren, north of Richfield Springs. It was formally called Abbott's Hill, as it was the site of Aaron Abbott's home and also Butternut Hill, from the big butternut trees that once stood on the hill.

References

Mountains of Otsego County, New York
Mountains of New York (state)
Mountains of Herkimer County, New York